The Complete and Utter History of Britain is a 1969 television comedy sketch show. It was created and written by Michael Palin and Terry Jones between the two series of Do Not Adjust Your Set. It was produced for and broadcast by London Weekend Television but was not shown in all of the other ITV regions.

Concept
The idea (inspired by a sketch in an earlier show, Twice a Fortnight) was to replay history as if television had been around at the time. Sketches included interviews with the vital characters in the dressing-room after the Battle of Hastings, Samuel Pepys presenting a television chat-show and an estate agent trying to sell Stonehenge to a young couple looking for their first home ("It's got character, charm and a slab in the middle").

Seven programmes were written and produced, but LWT amalgamated the first two episodes into a single "stronger" (in their opinion) episode, resulting in a six-part series - the final cut of the first episode being 25 minutes like the others (i.e. of the first two episodes as originally recorded, 25 minutes were discarded).

For many years, the entire series was believed to have been wiped. However, copies of the first two episodes (as broadcast) were eventually found, along with the complete first two episodes 'as produced'. The latter are in the form of poor quality video recordings, probably in CV-2000 format, with visible line structure and numerous instances of dropout. These were taken from the personal collection of the director, Maurice Murphy.

Terry Jones has expressed dissatisfaction with the series, complaining (after a showing of surviving episodes) that the pacing was off and the soundtrack all wrong.

Episodes
 Episode 1 -- 12 January 1969 ---- From the Dawn of History to the Norman Conquest
 Episode 2 -- 19 January 1969 ---- Richard the Lionheart to Robin the Hood
 Episode 3 -- 26 January 1969 ---- Edward the First to Richard the Last
 Episode 4 -- 2 February 1969 -- Perkin Warbeck to Bloody Mary
 Episode 5 -- 9 February 1969—The Great and Glorious Age of Elizabeth
 Episode 6 -- 16 February 1969 -- James the McFirst to Oliver Cromwell

Home media
On 7 April 2014, Network Distributing released all extant material on a Blu-ray/DVD set in the UK.  This release includes the first two episodes as broadcast, the first two episodes as recorded, which included the material removed from the TV broadcasts, and all available film inserts. New linking material for film inserts was recorded by Jones and Palin especially for this release, and included as a 50-minute programme entitled The New Incomplete Complete and Utter History of Britain.

References

External links
 A brief filmography of Terry Jones
 The Complete And Utter History Of Britain at epguides.com 
 Detailed information about  The Complete And Utter History Of Britain on the Pre-Python series page at The Origin of Monty Python website
 
 

1969 British television series debuts
1969 British television series endings
1960s British television sketch shows
ITV sketch shows
ITV comedy
Works by Terry Jones
Works by Michael Palin
English-language television shows
London Weekend Television shows